Dean Stockwell was an American actor whose accolades include two Cannes Best Actor Awards, two Golden Globe Awards, two Golden Globe nominations, one Academy Award nomination, and four Primetime Emmy Award nominations.

Stockwell, a child actor, first garnered critical acclaim for his role in  Gentleman's Agreement (1947), for which he won the Golden Globe for Best Juvenile Actor. He was later nominated for the Golden Globe for Best Actor – Motion Picture Drama for his role in Sons and Lovers (1960).

In 1990, he won his second Golden Globe, this time in the category of Golden Best Supporting Actor – Series, Miniseries or Television Film, for his role on the series Quantum Leap. He would earn a further two Golden Globe nominations for the series in this category, as well as four Primetime Emmy Award nominations for Outstanding Supporting Actor in a Drama Series.

Academy Awards
The Academy Awards are a set of awards given by the Academy of Motion Picture Arts and Sciences annually for excellence of cinematic achievements.

Cannes Film Festival

Golden Globe Awards
The Golden Globe Award is an accolade bestowed by the 93 members of the Hollywood Foreign Press Association (HFPA) recognizing excellence in film and television, both domestic and foreign.

Primetime Emmy Awards
The Primetime Emmy Awards are presented annually by the Academy of Television Arts & Sciences, also known as the Television Academy, to recognize and honor achievements in the television industry.

Viewers for Quality Television Awards

Critics associations

References

Lists of awards received by American actor